Matthew Peter Dunn (born 5 May 1992) is an English cricketer. Dunn is a left-handed batsman who bowls right-arm fast-medium.  He was born in Egham, Surrey.

Dunn has previously represented England Under-19s, having made his debut for the team against Bangladesh Under-19s in a Youth One Day International in 2009.  Following this he went on to play Youth Test and Youth Twenty20 Internationals.  During the 2010 season, he made his first-class debut for Surrey against the touring Bangladeshis.  He made three further first-class appearances for Surrey the following season, against Cambridge MCCU, and in the County Championship against Derbyshire and Gloucestershire.  In his four first-class appearances to date, he has taken 9 wickets at an average of 26.77, with best figures of 5/56.  His maiden five wicket haul came against Derbyshire, in his first County Championship match.

Dunn also made his List A debut in the 2011 season, though not for Surrey.  It instead came for an England Player Development XI against the touring Sri Lanka A team.  He took the wickets of Bhanuka Rajapaksa and Sajeewa Weerakoon for the cost of 32 runs from 6 overs.

References

External links

1992 births
Living people
People from Egham
English cricketers
Surrey cricketers
Marylebone Cricket Club cricketers